Joana Scrinzi (born 1981) is an Austrian film editor.

Biography
After graduating from high school in 1999, Scrinzi studied at the Musisches Gymnasium and ballet and dance training at Fachhochschule Salzburg Multi Media Art. During her studies, she made, among other things, a documentary film about ballet dancers and the relationship to her body and in 2003, she graduated with a degree in engineering. From 2004 to 2006, she worked as an assistant editor with Karina Ressler and Oliver Neumann, among others, for productions such as Hotel, Fallen, Revanche and Immer nie am Meer. The first full-length feature film for which she was responsible as editor was in März by director Klaus Händl, with whom she worked again for the film Tomcat in 2016.

Scrinzi is a member of the Academy of Austrian Films and the Austrian Film Editing Association. She is married to the film director Antonin Svoboda, with whom she has two children.

Awards and nominations 
 2017: 2017 Austrian Film Awards – Nominated in the Best Editor category for Tomcat
 2018: Diagonale – Best Artistic Editing of a Documentary for Gwendolyn and Nicht von schlechten Eltern
 2018: Schnitt-Preis – Nominated for Bild-Kunst Schnitt Preis Dokumentarfilm for Gwendolyn
 2021: Diagonale – Best Artistic Editing of a Feature Film  for Fuchs im Bau

Filmography 

 2008: März
 2010: Einmal mehr als nur reden
 2012: Outing
 2012: Warme Gefühle
 2012: Griffen
 2013: CERN
 2013: Schulden G.m.b.H.
 2013: Fiesta auf der Müllhalde
 2014: Was Wir Nicht Sehen
 2014: Tough Cookies
 2015: Drei Eier im Glas
 2016: Tomcat
 2017: Gwendolyn
 2017: Cry Baby, Cry (Nicht von schlechten Eltern)
 2020: Fuchs im Bau
 2021: Great Freedom

References

1981 births
Living people
Austrian film editors
Women film editors
People from Salzburg